Nina's Tragedies is a 2003 Israeli comedy-drama film about a boy Nadav and his aunt Nina. The film is shown from the perspective of Nadav and tells of his experiences regarding his aunt Nina and her loss, understanding love and confronting death in his family. The film is directed by Savi Gabizon and starring Ayelet Zurer, Yoram Hattab, Aviv Elkabets, Alon Abutbul, Shmil Ben Ari, and Anat Waxman.

Plot summary
Fourteen-year-old Nadav is hopelessly in love with his aunt Nina (Ayelet Zurer), who has recently lost her husband (Hattab). He is caught between the two worlds of his divorced parents: his mother (Waxman) is a high-strung fashionista, while his father (Ben Ari) has recently become devoutly Orthodox and withdrawn from the family in order to join a group of Hassidic Jews who tour Tel Aviv in a van, blasting the word of God through loudspeakers.

References

External links
 
 Nina’s Tragedies on Amazon

Israeli comedy-drama films
2000s Hebrew-language films
Films about the Israel Defense Forces